In mathematics, Drinfeld reciprocity, introduced by ,  is a correspondence between eigenforms of the moduli space of Drinfeld modules and factors of the corresponding Jacobian variety, such that all twisted L-functions are the same.

References

. English translation in Math. USSR  Sbornik 23 (1974) 561–592.

Modular forms